The Montreal Catholic School Commission (Commission des écoles catholiques de Montréal, CECM) was a Roman Catholic school district in Montreal, Quebec, Canada which operated both French-language and English-language schools. It was the largest school board in Quebec, and was created on June 9, 1846, at the same time as a Protestant school commission, which became the Protestant School Board of Greater Montreal. When Quebec's religious "confessional" school boards were replaced by linguistic ones in 1998, the French-language schools and the board's headquarters were turned over to the Commission scolaire de Montréal and its English-language schools to the English Montreal School Board.
In 1847, the board had 377 pupils. By 1917, this number increased to 75,000 students. The first kindergarten was established in 1914. An alliance of Catholic teachers was founded in 1919.
Primary education is established during the 1920s. During the 1930s, the MCSC began to distribute milk to students and the first school for the disabled opened.

Teachers threatened to strike in 1945. Union activist Léo Guindon was dismissed by the commission in 1948. In January 1949, a long strike paralyzed the board.
The English sector of the MCSC became independent in 1963. In 1964, the Ministry of Education of Quebec was established, reducing the authority of boards and religious leaders in the school system.
The school population reached a peak in 1970 with 229,000 pupils and 400 schools. The commissioners were originally appointed, but were elected for the first time in 1973. In 1981, the Levesque government of René Lévesque restricted access of the clergy to the schools.
In 1982, the commissioners introduced a program of sexuality education. In 1990, the committee adopted a policy to promote the use of French.

In 1996, when the district celebrated its 150th anniversary, it had a total of 130,000 students; of them 90,000, including 80,000 in the French-language schools and 10,000 in the English-language schools, were in the public school system. The district served Montreal, Côte Saint-Luc, Hampstead, Montréal-Nord, and Westmount.

As of 1996, the district had 229 French-language schools, including 150 elementary schools, 35 secondary schools, and 28 special schools (some operated adult education programmes, some operated vocational and technical programmes). The English-language schools included 20 elementary schools, 8 secondary schools, and five special schools. The district had 13 special schools for students with handicaps, disabilities, and behavioral problems. The district classified 40% of its enrollment as "multiethnic."

The end of the MCSC 
Groups such as the Committee for Neutral Schools opposed religious schools and religious school boards.
In the 1990s, a secular group called the Mouvement laïque québécois began a class action lawsuit against the board, and two political parties competed for power within the MCSC: the religious Regroupement scolaire confessionnel led by Michel Pallascio (RSM) et the secular Mouvement pour une école moderne et ouverte laïciste (MEMO) headed by Diane De Courcy.

The MCSC and the other confessional school boards were abolished on July 1, 1998 by the Marois reform which secularized the public schools in Montreal and created linguistic school boards.  The MCSC's last chairperson was Yves Archambault.

Most schools in the French-speaking sector went to the Commission scolaire de Montréal and those in the English-speaking sector went to the English Montreal School Board. Some schools in the eastern portion of the MCSC were transferred to the Commission scolaire de la Pointe-de-l'Île (CSPÎ), which had replaced the Commission scolaire Jérôme-Le Royer.

Schools

Elections for school trustees

1973

1977

1980

1983

See also

References

External links
  

Education in Montreal
Historical school districts in Quebec
English-language education in Quebec
Catholic Church in Quebec
Quebec Anglophone culture in Montreal